Ajla Tomljanović (born 7 May 1993) is an Australian professional tennis player. She has won four singles and three doubles titles on the ITF Circuit. On 31 October 2022, she reached a career-high singles ranking of world No. 33. On 5 January 2015, she peaked at No. 47 in the doubles rankings. Tomljanović was an accomplished junior player, having won the 2009 Australian Open girls' doubles title with Christina McHale. She reached a combined career-high junior ranking of world No. 4, on 30 March 2009.

Before 2014, Tomljanović played for her country of birth, Croatia. She began competing for Australia at the 2014 US Open after obtaining permanent residency in Australia. For the next four years she was required to represent Croatia at all non-Grand Slam events, until she was granted Australian citizenship in January 2018, allowing her to represent the country at all events on the WTA Tour.

Early life
Tomljanović was born in Zagreb to Croatian father Ratko Tomljanović who played handball professionally (winner of the 1992 and 1993 handball European Cup) and Bosniak mother Emina. Her older sister Hana played tennis for the University of Virginia. Ajla began playing tennis at the age of six and moved to Florida for higher level training when she was 13.  In the latter stages of 2014, Tomljanović took up permanent residency in Brisbane to be closer to her cousin Isabella Bozicevic's family who were based in the neighbouring Gold Coast as well as begin training at the Queensland Tennis Centre and in doing so switched allegiances to represent Australia in the four Grand Slams. In 2018, her application for Australian citizenship was approved which allowed her to begin representing her adopted country at WTA Tour events as well as competing for Australia in the Fed Cup.

Tomljanović is coached by Fernando Martínez and Rene Gomez. Along with tennis, she is also a fan of basketball.

Junior years
Tomljanović won the 2009 Australian Open girls' doubles title with Christina McHale, defeating Aleksandra Krunić and Sandra Zaniewska in the final.

Professional career

Early years
Tomljanović played her first professional ITF Circuit event in October 2008 in Mexico City, and lost to Estefanía Craciún in the semifinals. She then qualified for another ITF event in Mexico City, but lost to Karolina Kosińska in the second round. In January 2009, she qualified for the ITF event in Boca Raton, Florida, where she lost to Heidi El Tabakh in the second round. Tomljanović was awarded a wildcard for Indian Wells Open in, and lost to Angela Haynes. Tomljanović then made a chain of three consecutive losses in the second rounds, at the ITF tournaments in Redding, California, Osprey, Florida, and Makarska, Croatia, losing to, respectively Rika Fujiwara, Kateřina Kramperová and Ana Savić. At the ITF event in Zagreb, she lost to Tereza Hladíková in the first round. On 10 May 2009 in Zagreb, she won her first ITF doubles title, partnering with fellow Croatian Petra Martić.

Tomljanović missed most of the 2012 season due to mononucleosis.

2014: French Open fourth round, top 50 breakthrough

During the preseason, Tomljanović began working with coach David Taylor, former Australian Fed Cup captain, who had just parted company with Samantha Stosur.
  
She started the year at the Shenzhen Open, where she lost in the first round to eighth seed Annika Beck. Tomljanović then played as a wildcard at the Sydney International. She beat former world No. 5, Daniela Hantuchová, in the first round. She was defeated in the second round by Madison Keys, in three sets. Ranked 67 at the Australian Open, Tomljanović defeated Tadeja Majerič in the first round. In the second round, she lost to 13th seed Sloane Stephens in a three-setter. 
  
She lost at the Pattaya Open in the first round to qualifier Alla Kudryavtseva, in straight sets. At the Mexican Open, she reached the quarterfinals by beating fourth seed Magdaléna Rybáriková and qualifier Victoria Duval. However, she lost in her quarterfinal match to eighth seed Zhang Shuai. At the Indian Wells Open, she lost in the second round to 17th seed Sloane Stephens. Tomljanović reached the third round at the Miami Open by defeating Kristina Mladenovic and 30th seed Garbiñe Muguruza. She ended up losing to American Varvara Lepchenko, in three sets.

Tomljanović started clay-court season at the Charleston Open. In the first round, she upset last year semifinalist Stefanie Vögele. In the second round, she got revenge on 16th seed Zhang Shuai. In the third round, she lost to second seed Jelena Janković. Tomljanović qualified for the main draw of the Porsche Tennis Grand Prix by beating Carina Witthöft, Sachia Vickery, and fifth seed Mona Barthel. In the first round, Tomljanović was defeated by Alisa Kleybanova. Seeded 13th, she lost in the first round of qualifying at the Madrid Open to Katarzyna Piter. Seeded 15th, she was defeated in the second round of qualifying at the Internazionali d'Italia by Chanelle Scheepers, 6–2, 6–0. Playing in her final tournament before the French Open at the Internationaux de Strasbourg, Tomljanović lost in the second round to Zarina Diyas.

Ranked No. 72 at the French Open, she got her tournament run to a great start by upsetting 2010 French Open champion Francesca Schiavone in the first round. In the second, she upset 32nd seed Elena Vesnina, in two sets. Then she stunned third seed Agnieszka Radwańska to advance to the fourth round of a Grand Slam for the first time in her career, where her run came to an end when she lost to 14th seed Carla Suárez Navarro. Her best showing at the French Open improved her ranking from 72 to No. 51.

Tomljanović started on grass at the Birmingham Classic where she lost in the first round to Mona Barthel. Seeded third for qualifying at the Eastbourne International, she lost in the final round of qualifying to seventh seed Francesca Schiavone, 7–6, 0–6, 6–7. Ranked 53 at Wimbledon, Tomljanović was defeated in the first round by Heather Watson.

In her first-round match at the Gastein Ladies, she retired trailing 6–3, 3–0 to qualifier Ana Bogdan.

Tomljanović began her US Open series at the Stanford Classic where she was defeated in the first round by eighth seed Andrea Petkovic. Receiving a wildcard to play in the main draw at the Rogers Cup, she lost in the first round to qualifier Shelby Rogers. Seeded 11th for qualifying at the Western & Southern Open, Tomljanović lost in the first round of qualifying to Julia Görges. Ranked 55 at the US Open, she was defeated in the first round by 15th seed Carla Suárez Navarro.

Seeded second at the Coupe Banque Nationale, Tomljanović lost in the second round to Andrea Hlaváčková, in three sets. Seeded 15th for qualifying at the first edition of the Wuhan Open, she lost in the first round to Donna Vekić, 7–6, 2–6, 4–6. Seeded ninth for qualifying at the China Open, she lost in the final round to fourth seed Tsvetana Pironkova. Seeded eighth at the first edition of the Tianjin Open, Tomljanović reached the quarterfinals defeating qualifier Nadiia Kichenok and Duan Yingying. In the quarterfinals, she lost to second seed Peng Shuai. Tomljanović played her final tournament of the year at the Kremlin Cup. She defeated Alexandra Panova in the first round. In the second, she was defeated by fourth seed Lucie Šafářová.

Tomljanović ended the season ranked 63.

2015: First WTA Tour final

Tomljanović started the 2015 season at the Brisbane International which she entered as a wildcard. In the first round, she scored the biggest win of her career, defeating former world No. 1 and sixth seed, Jelena Janković, in straight sets. She saved two set points in the first set tiebreak on her way to her first-round victory. In the second round, she lost to Elina Svitolina. In Hobart, she was defeated in the first round by Karin Knapp. At the Australian Open, she lost in the second round to 30th seed Varvara Lepchenko.

At the Thailand Open, Tomljanović reached her first WTA Tour final; however, in the championship match, she was defeated by Daniela Hantuchová. As a result of her performance, she rose to world No. 49. Seeded tenth at the Mexican Open, she lost in the first round to Magdaléna Rybáriková. In March, Tomljanović competed at the Indian Wells Open. She was defeated in the first round by American wildcard Irina Falconi. Playing in Miami, she lost in the first round to Kurumi Nara.

Tomljanović began her clay-court season at the Family Circle Cup where she was defeated in the second round by Andreea Mitu. Seeded third at the Copa Colsanitas, Tomljanović lost in the first round to Alexandra Panova. At the Madrid Open, she was defeated in the second round by former world No. 1, Victoria Azarenka. She then attempted to qualify for the Italian Open but lost in the final round to Misaki Doi. Tomljanović played her final tournament before the French Open at the Internationaux de Strasbourg. She reached the quarterfinals where she was defeated by third seed and eventual champion, Sam Stosur. At the French Open, Tomljanović lost in the second round to 11th seed Angelique Kerber.

She began grass-court season at the first edition of the Nottingham Open. As the eighth seed, she was defeated in the first round by Lauren Davis. At the Birmingham Classic, Tomljanović lost in the first round to British wildcard Naomi Broady. Tomljanović was defeated in the second round of qualifying at the Eastbourne International to Irina Falconi. At Wimbledon, Tomljanović lost in the second round to 13th seed and 2012 finalist, Agnieszka Radwańska.

Seeded second at the Brasil Tennis Cup, she was defeated in the second round by Tereza Martincová.

Tomljanović started the US Open Series at the Stanford Classic where she advanced to the quarterfinals defeating Vitalia Diatchenko and seventh seed Madison Keys. She lost her quarterfinal match to fourth seed and eventual finalist, Karolína Plíšková. At the Rogers Cup, she was defeated in the final round of qualifying by Irina Falconi. At the US Open, Tomljanović lost in the first round to Karin Knapp.

Seeded seventh at the Japan Women's Open, she reached the semifinals where she was defeated by Yanina Wickmayer. At the Korea Open, Tomljanović lost in the first round to Japanese wildcard Kimiko Date-Krumm. Despite qualifying for the Wuhan Open, she was defeated in the first round by 11th seed Belinda Bencic. Tomljanović played her final tournament of the year at the China Open. She retired in her final round of qualifying match against Yulia Putintseva.

Tomljanović ended the year ranked 66.

2016: Shoulder injury
Tomljanović started her season at the Brisbane International. She lost in the first round to sixth seed Carla Suárez Navarro. At the Australian Open, she was defeated in the first round by Kateryna Bondarenko.

In February, Tomljanović underwent shoulder surgery, side-lining her for the rest of the season.

She ended the season ranked 930.

2017: Return from injury
Tomljanović returned to competitive play in February at the Mexican Open. She won her first match since her return by upsetting sixth seed Eugenie Bouchard in the first round. In the second round, she retired after losing the first set to Kirsten Flipkens due to a right shoulder injury. At the Indian Wells Open, she lost in the first round to Julia Görges. In Miami, she had her second win of the season defeating lucky loser Magda Linette in the first round. Then, she stunned 13th seed and Indian Wells champion, Elena Vesnina, in three sets. In the third round, she was defeated by Lucie Šafářová. At the Revolution Technologies Pro Tennis Classic in Indian Harbour Beach, she lost in the first round to American wildcard Victoria Duval.

Competing as a wildcard at the Boyd Tinsley Clay Court Classic, Tomljanović advanced to the semifinals where she lost to Caroline Dolehide. At the LTP Charleston Pro Tennis, Tomljanović retired after losing the first set 4–6 to top seed Madison Brengle due to a hip injury. She competed in her final tournament before the French Open at the Nürnberger Versicherungscup and lost in the first round to Kirsten Flipkens. Ranked 311 at the French Open, she was defeated in the first round by 18th seed and last-year semifinalist Kiki Bertens.

Receiving a wildcard to play at the Bol Open, Tomljanović lost in the first round to eighth seed Maria Sakkari.

At the Stanford Classic, she retired in her first-round match due to a shoulder injury, after losing the first set 2–6 to sixth seed CoCo Vandeweghe.

After a first-round win over Johanna Larsson at the US Open, she lost in the second round to Aleksandra Krunić.

Tomljanović ended the season ranked No. 151.

2018: Australian citizen, two WTA finals
She commenced the new season at the Brisbane International defeating Destanee Aiava but lost in the second round to Johanna Konta. Tomljanović lost in the first round of the Australian Open to Lucie Šafářová before reaching consecutive semifinals on WTA 125 tournaments, at Newport Beach and Indian Wells.

Tomljanović reached the final in Rabat, where she lost to Elise Mertens. At the French Open, she lost to the fourth seed Elina Svitolina in the first round, losing a 5–1 lead in the first set.

At the US Open, Tomljanović lost in the second round to Katerina Siniakova despite having a match point. Shortly after, she put together a good stretch of form to reach the final in Seoul, which she lost in three sets to Kiki Bertens.

Tomljanović ended the season ranked No. 43.

2019: Fourth WTA final, career-high ranking and top 40 debut

Tomljanović began season at the Brisbane International. She made it to the quarterfinals where she lost to fifth seed and eventual champion, Karolína Plíšková. In Sydney, she was defeated in the first round by Camila Giorgi. At the Australian Open, she lost in a first-round thriller to Johanna Konta.

Seeded sixth at the Thailand Open, Tomljanović reached the final where she lost to eighth seed Dayana Yastremska. She led 5–2 in the final set but couldn't close out the match. Coming through qualifying at the Qatar Open, she lost in the first round to ninth seed Julia Görges. In Dubai, she was defeated in the first round by Zheng Saisai. In March, she played at the Indian Wells Open. She lost in the second round to ninth seed Aryna Sabalenka. At the Miami Open, Tomljanović upset ninth seed Sabalenka in the second round for her second career-win over a top-ten player. She was defeated in a third-round thriller by 21st seed Anett Kontaveit. As a result, she reached a career-high of No. 39 on 1 April 2019.

Tomljanović started the clay-court season at the Charleston Open. Seeded 14th, she lost in the third round to top seed and 2016 champion, Sloane Stephens. Seeded fifth at the İstanbul Cup, she was defeated in the first round by eventual finalist Markéta Vondroušová.

2020: Mixed results, out of top 50
Tomljanović started 2020 at the Brisbane International. She lost in the second round to second seed, defending and eventual champion, Karolína Plíšková. Playing at the first edition of the Adelaide International, she was defeated in the second round by second seed Simona Halep. 
At the Australian Open, she lost in the second round to eventual finalist Garbiñe Muguruza.

In February, Tomljanović played at the St. Petersburg Ladies' Trophy. She was defeated in the second round by Russian qualifier Anastasia Potapova. At the Dubai Tennis Championships, she lost in the first round of qualifying to Bethanie Mattek-Sands. In Doha, she was defeated in the second round by 11th seed Garbiñe Muguruza.

The WTA Tour suspended tournaments from the end of March to July due to the COVID-19 pandemic. When the WTA resumed tournaments in August, Tomljanović competed at the Lexington Challenger where she lost in the first round to fifth seed Yulia Putintseva. She was defeated in the first round of the Western & Southern Open by Veronika Kudermetova. At the US Open, she lost in the first round to 17th seed and 2016 US Open champion, Angelique Kerber.

During the week of September 14, Tomljanović was in Rome playing at the Italian Open. She was defeated in the first round by Marie Bouzková. In Strasbourg, she lost in the first round to qualifier Zhang Shuai. At the French Open, she was defeated in her first-round match by 20th seed Maria Sakkari.

Tomljanović ended the year ranked 68.

2021: First Grand Slam quarterfinal
Tomljanović started the 2021 season at the first edition of the Abu Dhabi Open. She lost in the second round to fourth seed and eventual champion, Aryna Sabalenka. Playing at the first edition of the Gippsland Trophy, she was defeated in the first round by Alizé Cornet. At the Australian Open, she lost in the second round to second seed Simona Halep.

Tomljanović was defeated in the second round at the first edition of the Phillip Island Trophy to seventh seed Anastasia Pavlyuchenkova. In Adelaide, she lost in the first round to qualifier and compatriot, Storm Sanders. At the Miami Open, she was defeated in the second round by second seed Naomi Osaka.

Beginning her clay-court season at the Charleston Open, Tomljanović reached the third round where she lost to Sloane Stephens. Seeded sixth at the first edition of the MUSC Health Women's Open, she was defeated in the second round by Clara Tauson. Coming through qualifying in Madrid, she lost in the first round to Elena Rybakina. Getting past qualifying at the Italian Open, she was defeated in the second round by 2017 French Open champion Jeļena Ostapenko. At the first edition of the Serbia Open, she retired during her second-round match against seventh seed Rebecca Peterson due to a hip injury. At the French Open, she lost in the second round to 31st seed and eventual finalist, Anastasia Pavlyuchenkova.

Starting the grass-court season at the Birmingham Classic, Tomljanović upset top seed Elise Mertens in a three-set battle in the first round. In the second round, she was defeated by qualifier Coco Vandeweghe. Competing at the Eastbourne International, she lost in the final round of qualifying to Camila Giorgi. At Wimbledon, she reached the quarterfinals of a Grand Slam championship for the first time in her career where she was defeated by top seed, compatriot, and eventual champion, Ashleigh Barty.

Representing Australia at the Tokyo Summer Olympics, Tomljanović defeated in her first round match Kazakh Yaroslava Shvedova who retired due to heat illness.

In November, Tomljanović represented again Australia at the Billie Jean King Cup Finals defeating Aliaksandra Sasnovich in the second tie. Australia lost in the semifinals against Switzerland. Tomljanović ended the year ranked 45.

2022: Second Wimbledon & first US Open quarterfinals
Tomljanović started her 2022 season at the Adelaide International 1. She lost to sixth seed, Sofia Kenin, in her second-round match. She led 6–3, 5–3, and had three match points, but Kenin came back and won the match in three sets. In Sydney, she was defeated in the second round by fifth seed and eventual champion, Paula Badosa. Tomljanović entered the Australian Open ranked World No. 43, and she fell in the first round, losing for the second time in a month to World No. 6 Paula Badosa.

Following the Australian Open, Tomljanović struggled with form, losing in the second round at Indian Wells, to Sorana Cîrstea, and the first round of the Miami Open, to lucky loser Lucia Bronzetti.

Tomljanović began the clay-court season by making the second round of the Charleston Open where she lost to Irina-Camelia Begu in straight sets. In the lead-up to the French Open, she made the quarter-finals at the Istanbul Open and Morocco Open. At the French Open, Tomljanović defeated Anett Kontaveit in the opening round. Her win over the fifth-ranked Kontaveit marked her biggest win, by ranking, since defeating Radwańska at the same event eight years earlier. She lost to Varvara Gracheva in the second round.

Tomljanović reached back-to-back quarterfinals at the Wimbledon Championships, defeating Jil Teichmann, Catherine Harrison, Barbora Krejčíková, and Alize Cornet en route, before losing to eventual champion Elena Rybakina.

Tomljanović started the North American hard-court swing at the Citi Open, losing to eventual champion Liudmila Samsonova in three sets. She reached the second round of the Canadian Open before losing in straight sets to World No. 1 Iga Świątek. At the Western & South Open Tomljanović reached her maiden WTA 1000 quarterfinal. After making her way through qualifying, Tomljanovic defeated Taylor Townsend and world No. 4 Paula Badosa, the latter victory marking her third career top-5 win and sixth top-10 win overall - and avenging two losses to Badosa earlier in the year. After defeating Veronika Kudermetova to reach the quarter-finals, Tomljanović lost to Petra Kvitová in straight sets.

At the US Open, Tomljanović defeated Karolína Muchová and Evgeniya Rodina, both of whom are in an injury protected ranking, to reach the third round, where she defeated former World No. 1 and 23-time Grand Slam champion Serena Williams, also on injury protected ranking, in three sets. It was the final professional singles match for Williams, who had announced that she would retire after the tournament. Tomljanović after the match said, "I'm feeling really sorry, just because I love Serena just as much as you guys do. And what she's done for me, for the sport of tennis, is incredible... she is the greatest of all time." Tomljanović defeated Liudmila Samsonova in straight sets to reach her third Grand Slam quarterfinal, and her first at the US Open. In the quarterfinals, she lost to World No. 5 Ons Jabeur in straight sets.

Tomljanovic finished the season at a career-high ranking of No. 33 in the world.

2023: Australian Open withdrawal

Late 2022, Tomljanovic was announced to be a part of the Australian 2023 United Cup team. Tomljanovic arrived in Sydney to play the event. Australia was placed in Group D with Great Britain and Spain. Before Australia's tie against Great Britain, Tomljanovic announced her withdrawal from her first match against Harriet Dart due to a knee injury. Tomljanovic was then scheduled to play Spain's Paula Badosa in the following days, however she did not participate for the same reason.

Tomljanovic then skipped the Adelaide International and travelled to Melbourne to prepare for the upcoming 2023 Australian Open. Tomljanovic was scheduled to play Nadia Podoroska of Argentina in the first round of the event. Unfortunety, two days before the start of the tournament Tomjlanovic again had to withdraw from her home Grand Slam due to the same lingering knee issue.

Apparel and equipment
Tomljanović wears Original Penguin clothing and uses Wilson racquets. She has previously been sponsored by Nike and K-Swiss for clothing and apparel.

World TeamTennis
Tomljanovic made her World TeamTennis debut with the Vegas Rollers during the 2020 WTT season played at The Greenbrier.

Personal life 
Tomljanović became an Australian citizen in January 2018.

She was in a relationship with Australian tennis player Nick Kyrgios from 2017 to 2018. 
From 2019 until 2022, she dated Italian tennis player Matteo Berrettini.

Tomljanovic is close friends with fellow player Félix Auger-Aliassime, who is dating her cousin.

Performance timelines

Only main-draw results in WTA Tour, Grand Slam tournaments, Fed Cup/Billie Jean King Cup and Olympic Games are included in win–loss records.

Singles
Current through the 2022 Ostrava Open.

Doubles
Current after the 2022 US Open.

WTA career finals

Singles: 4 (4 runner-ups)

ITF Circuit finals

Singles: 14 (4 titles, 10 runner–ups)

Doubles: 4 (3 titles, 1 runner–up)

Junior Grand Slam tournament finals

Girls' doubles: 1 (1 title)

WTA Tour career earnings
Current after the 2022 Tallinn Open.
{|cellpadding=3 cellspacing=0 border=1 style=border:#aaa;solid:1px;border-collapse:collapse;text-align:center;
|-style=background:#eee;font-weight:bold
|width="90"|Year
|width="100"|Grand Slam titles'|width="100"|WTA titles
|width="100"|Total titles
|width="120"|Earnings ($)
|width="100"|Money list rank
|-
|2014
|0
|0
|0
| align="right" |514,541
|55
|-
|2015
|0
|0
|0
| align="right" |454,141
|63
|-
|2016
|0
|0
|0
|align="right" |46,771
|258
|-
|2017
|0
|0
|0
|align="right" |240,764
|134
|-
|2018
|0
|0
|0
|align="right" |495,406
| 74
|-
|2019
|0
|0
|0
| align="right" |749,597
|53
|-
|2020
|0
|0
|0
| align="right" |346,067
|64
|-
|2021
|0
|0
|0
| align="right" |1,065,535
|30
|-
|2022
|0
|0
|0
| align="right" |1,342,840
|23
|- style="font-weight:bold;"
|Career
|0
|0
|0
| align="right" |5,621,033
|114
|}

Head-to-head records
Record against top 10 playersTomljanović's record against players who have been ranked in the top 10. Active players are in boldface.''

Top 10 wins per season

Notes

References

External links

 
 
 
 
 
 
 

1993 births
Australian Open (tennis) junior champions
Australian expatriates in the United States
Croatian female tennis players
Australian female tennis players
Australian people of Bosnia and Herzegovina descent
Croatian emigrants to Australia
Tennis players from Brisbane
Living people
Tennis players from Zagreb
Grand Slam (tennis) champions in girls' doubles
Naturalised citizens of Australia
Naturalised tennis players
Australian people of Croatian descent
Croatian people of Bosniak descent
Olympic tennis players of Australia
Tennis players at the 2020 Summer Olympics